By-elections to two state assembly constituencies were held in Tamil Nadu, India, in two separate phases. Election for Madurai Central was held on 11 October 2006 and for Madurai West was held on 26 June 2007. The election results were not expected to change the prospects of the party in power, the Dravida Munnetra Kazhagam (DMK), and its Chief Minister M. Karunanidhi.

Both phases of this by-election resulted in a big victory for DMK and Indian National Congress, who were part of the Democratic Progressive Alliance. Even though in 2006 assembly elections, AIADMK and its allies got more votes than DPA, when all the constituencies in Madurai are taken into account, the victory in both Madurai constituencies shows the increase in support by the people of Madurai for the DMK government and its policies since 2006.

Results by alliance

These results reflect alliances that were present after the second by-election in 2007.

 The number on the left, in the table, represents the total number of MLAs after the by-election, and the number in parenthesis represents, the seats picked up or lost due to the by-election
 The numbers presented for 2006, represents, the alliance, when the VCK/DPI allied with the AIADMK.

First by-election 
This election was necessitated due to the death of P. T. R. Palanivel Rajan of the DMK, who was a Minister in the current DMK government.

Madurai Central 
Source: Arasiyal Talk and ThatsTamil

Second by-election 
The election was necessitated by the death of AIADMK MLA, S.V. Shanmugam.

Madurai West 
Source: Arasiyal Talk

See also 
Elections in Tamil Nadu
Legislature of Tamil Nadu
Government of Tamil Nadu

References 

State Assembly elections in Tamil Nadu
2000s in Tamil Nadu
By-elections in Tamil Nadu
2006 State Assembly elections in India
2007 State Assembly elections in India